Mahakali Zone was one of the fourteen zones of Nepal, comprising four districts, namely, Baitadi, Dadeldhura, Darchula and Kanchanpur. Here is district wise List of Monuments which are in the Mahakali Zone.

Mahakali Zone
 List of monuments in Baitadi District 
 List of monuments in Dadeldhura District 
 List of monuments in Darchula District
 List of monuments in Kanchanpur District

References

Mahakali Zone